The Caspian languages are a branch of Northwestern Iranian languages spoken in northern Iran and south-eastern Azerbaijan, south of the Caspian Sea. They are unique in that they share certain typological features with South Caucasian languages.

Languages
Caspian languages include:
 Deilami
 Gilaki
 Talysh
 Mazanderani
 Semnani
 Tati

References

Northwestern Iranian languages
Languages of Iran